Sacca may refer to:
 Sacca, a Pāli word meaning "real" or "true"

Places 
 Sacca, the word for an artificial island in the Venetian Lagoon, see Sacca Fisola, Sacca San Biagio and Sacca Sessola

People
 Name
 Jerome Sacca Kina Guezere (1952–2005), Beninese politician
 Sacca Lafia (born 1944), Beninese politician 

 Surname
 Ammonius Saccas, the master of Plotinus and Origen
 Brian Sacca (born 1978), American actor, writer and producer
 John Sacca (born 1971), American football quarterback 
 Chris Sacca, American venture investor and public speaker
 Crystal English Sacca, American venture investor and author
 Jimmy Sacca (1929-2015), a component of the popular music singing group The Hilltoppers
 Tony Sacca (born 1970), American football quarterback
 Roberto Saccà (born 1961), German operatic tenor

Other uses 
 Sacca-kiriyā, a solemn declaration of truth, expressed in ritual speech
 Samudaya sacca, the Four Noble Truths of Buddhism

 Streets Ahead Children's Centre UK, a United Kingdom based charity set up to help the street children of Rwanda